Vitaliy Kiselyov (born 20 February 1983), is a Ukrainian futsal player who plays for Lokomotiv Kharkiv and the Ukraine national futsal team.

References

External links
UEFA profile

1983 births
Living people
Ukrainian men's futsal players
MFC Lokomotyv Kharkiv players
Sportspeople from Kharkiv